Derek Savage may refer to:

 Derek Savage (poet) (1917–2007), pacifist poet and critic
 Derek Savage (Gaelic footballer) (born 1978), former inter-county Gaelic football player for Galway
 Derek Savage (movie director), creator of "Cool Cat" children's movie series